The 1996–97 Czech First League was the fourth season of top-tier football in the Czech Republic. The season saw a Czech league attendance record for a single match, as 44,120 watched the game between Boby Brno and Slavia Prague.

League changes

Relegated to the 1996–97 Czech 2. Liga
 Svit Zlín (15th)
 Uherské Hradiště (16th)

Dissolved after the 1995–96 Czech First League
 Union Cheb (bankruptcy; 13th)

Promoted from the 1995–96 Czech 2. Liga
 Bohemians Prague (4th)
 Karviná (1st)
 Teplice (2nd)

Stadia and locations

League table

Results

Top goalscorers

See also
 1996–97 Czech Cup
 1996–97 Czech 2. Liga

References

  ČMFS statistics

Czech First League seasons
Czech
1996–97 in Czech football